Clarazia is an extinct genus of thalattosaur from the Middle Triassic of Monte San Giorgio in Switzerland. It is represented by a single type species, Clarazia schinzi, which was named in 1936.

References

Thalattosaurs
Middle Triassic reptiles of Europe
Prehistoric reptile genera
Fossil taxa described in 1936